Lilah Markman (born January 1, 1971) is an Israeli contemporary artist, sculptor, photographer, painter, and documentary film director.

Early life, education and career 
Lilah Markman was born on January 1, 1971, and grew up in Nahariya. In 1995, Markman completed visual communication studies at the Bezalel Academy of Arts and Design in Jerusalem. In 2005, she graduated with BA in communication and psychology, from the Open University. In 2002, Markman earned her MFA in Film & Television from the Tel Aviv University. She studied in the postgraduate Fine Art Program at HaMidrasha Faculty of the Arts, Beit Berl College, which she completed in 2018. Markman wrote, directed and produced her debut documentary Rock Paper Scissors, a 54-minute documentary released in 2018. The documentary received multiple awards from national and international film festivals.

Awards and recognitions 

Rock Paper Scissors
 Exceptional Merit in Biography category, Docs Without Borders Film Festival (DWBFF), Nassau U.S.A., 2018
 OFFICIAL SELECTION, International Women's Film Festival, Orlando, Florida, 2018
 Best Short Documentary Film Award, NIFF Noida International Film Festival, India, 2019
 First prize, Independent category, On Art Film Festival, Poland, 2019
 Best Documentary Film Award, Pärnu International Documentary Film Festival, Estonia, 2019
 Bronze Remi Award, WorldFest-Houston International Film Festival , Texas U.S.A., 2019

Selected exhibitions

Solo 
 2004: "Dream mache", The Farm Gallery, Holon, Israel
 2005: "A different spirit", The Moshavim Gallery, Tel Aviv, Israel
 2006: "Night bodies" - video art, sculpture and performance, HaMidrasha Art School, Beit Berl, Israel

Group 
 2006: "Disappearance", Petah Tikva Museum of Art, Petah Tikva, Israel
 2017: "Remote viewing", Krakow Museum, Krakow, Poland
 2018: "Flexibility Exercises", Yarkon Gallery, Tel Aviv, Israel
 2019: "What the Matter Wants?", Givon Gallery, Tel Aviv, Israel
 2022: A-Vitruvian- feminist activist group exhibition, Binyamin Gallery, Tel Aviv, Israel

Gallery

References

External links 

Living people
1971 births
Israeli video artists
Israeli women artists
Israeli women film directors
Israeli women sculptors
Israeli women painters
Open University of Israel alumni